Galium bermudense, the Bermuda bedstraw, is a plant species in the family Rubiaceae. It is native to Bermuda, the Bahamas, and the southeastern United States (all the coastal states from Texas to New Jersey).

References

External links
 Gardening Europe

bermudense
Flora of Bermuda
Flora of the Bahamas
Flora of the Eastern United States
Plants described in 1753
Taxa named by Carl Linnaeus
Flora without expected TNC conservation status